YCI is a three-letter acronym with multiple meanings as described below:

Youth Challenge International, Canadian youth-focused international development NGO
Youth Challenge International, formerly Youth Challenge Connecticut
Young Communist International